The Wollaston Medal is a scientific award for geology, the highest award granted by the Geological Society of London.

The medal is named after William Hyde Wollaston, and was first awarded in 1831. It was originally made of gold (1831–1845), then palladium, a metal discovered by Wollaston (1846–1860).  Next in gold again (1861–1929) and then in palladium again (1930–present).

Laureates
Source:Geological Society

1831–1850
1831 William 'Strata' Smith
1835 Gideon Mantell
1836 Louis Agassiz
1837 Proby Thomas Cautley
1837 Hugh Falconer
1838 Richard Owen
1839 Christian Gottfried Ehrenberg
1840 André Hubert Dumont
1841 Adolphe-Théodore Brongniart
1842 Leopold von Buch
1843 Jean-Baptiste Élie de Beaumont
1843 Pierre Armand Dufrenoy
1844 William Conybeare
1845 John Phillips
1846 William Lonsdale
1847 Ami Boué
1848 William Buckland
1849 Joseph Prestwich
1850 William Hopkins

1851–1900
1851 Adam Sedgwick
1852 William Henry Fitton
1853 Adolphe d'Archiac
1853 Édouard de Verneuil
1854 Richard John Griffith
1855 Henry De la Beche
1856 William Edmond Logan
1857 Joachim Barrande
1858 Hermann von Meyer
1859 Charles Darwin
1860 Searles Valentine Wood
1861 Heinrich Georg Bronn
1862 Robert Alfred Cloyne Godwin-Austen
1863 Gustav Bischof
1864 Roderick Murchison
1865 Thomas Davidson
1866 Charles Lyell
1867 George Poulett Scrope
1868 Carl Friedrich Naumann
1869 Henry Clifton Sorby
1870 Gérard Paul Deshayes
1871 Andrew Ramsay
1872 James Dwight Dana
1873 Philip de Malpas Grey Egerton
1874 Oswald Heer
1875 Laurent-Guillaume de Koninck
1876 Thomas Henry Huxley
1877 Robert Mallet
1878 Thomas Wright
1879 Bernhard Studer
1880 Auguste Daubrée
1881 Peter Martin Duncan
1882 Franz Ritter von Hauer
1883 William Thomas Blanford
1884 Albert Jean Gaudry
1885 George Busk
1886 Alfred Des Cloizeaux
1887 John Whitaker Hulke
1888 Henry Benedict Medlicott
1889 Thomas George Bonney
1890 William Crawford Williamson
1891 John Wesley Judd
1892 Ferdinand von Richthofen
1893 Nevil Story Maskelyne
1894 Karl Alfred von Zittel
1895 Archibald Geikie
1896 Eduard Suess
1897 Wilfred Hudleston Hudleston
1898 Ferdinand Zirkel
1899 Charles Lapworth
1900 Grove Karl Gilbert

1901–1950
1901 Charles Barrois
1902 Friedrich Schmidt
1903 Heinrich Rosenbusch
1904 Albert Heim
1905 Jethro Teall
1906 Henry Woodward
1907 William Johnson Sollas
1908 Paul Heinrich von Groth
1909 Horace Bolingbroke Woodward
1910 William Berryman Scott
1911 Waldemar Christofer Brøgger
1912 Lazarus Fletcher
1913 Osmond Fisher
1914 John Edward Marr
1915 Edgeworth David
1916 Alexander Karpinsky
1917 Alfred Lacroix
1918 Charles Doolittle Walcott
1919 Aubrey Strahan
1920 Gerard De Geer
1921 Ben Peach
1921 John Horne
1922 Alfred Harker
1923 William Whitaker
1924 Arthur Smith Woodward
1925 George William Lamplugh
1926 Henry Fairfield Osborn
1927 William Whitehead Watts
1928 Dukinfield Henry Scott
1929 Friedrich Johann Karl Becke
1930 Albert Seward
1931 Arthur William Rogers
1932 Johan Herman Lie Vogt
1933 Marcellin Boule
1934 Henry Alexander Miers
1935 John Flett
1936 Gustaaf Adolf Frederik Molengraaff
1937 Waldemar Lindgren
1938 Maurice Lugeon
1939 Frank Dawson Adams
1940 Henry Woods
1941 Arthur Louis Day
1942 Reginald Aldworth Daly
1943 Alexander Fersman
1944 Victor Goldschmidt
1945 Owen Thomas Jones
1946 Emmanuel de Margerie
1947 Joseph Tyrrell
1948 Edward Battersby Bailey
1949 Robert Broom
1950 Norman L. Bowen

1951–2000
1951 Olaf Holtedahl
1952 Herbert Harold Read
1953 Erik Stensiö
1954 Leonard Johnston Wills
1955 Arthur Elijah Trueman
1956 Arthur Holmes
1957 Paul Fourmarier
1958 Pentti Eskola
1959 Pierre Pruvost
1960 Cecil Edgar Tilley
1961 Roman Kozłowski
1962 Leonard Hawkes
1963 Felix Andries Vening Meinesz
1964 Harold Jeffreys
1965 D. M. S. Watson
1966 Francis Parker Shepard
1967 Edward Crisp Bullard
1968 Raymond Cecil Moore
1969 William Maurice Ewing
1970 Philip Henry Kuenen
1971 Ralph Alger Bagnold
1972 Hans Ramberg
1973 Alfred Sherwood Romer
1974 Francis J. Pettijohn
1975 Hollis Dow Hedberg
1976 Kingsley Charles Dunham
1977 Reinout Willem van Bemmelen
1978 John Tuzo Wilson
1979 Hatton Schuyler Yoder
1980 Augusto Gansser
1981 Robert Minard Garrels
1982 Peter John Wyllie
1983 Dan Peter McKenzie
1984 Kenneth J. Hsu
1985 Gerald Joseph Wasserburg
1986 John G. Ramsay
1987 Claude Jean Allègre
1988 Alfred Ringwood
1989 Drummond Hoyle Matthews
1990 Wallace S. Broecker
1991 Xavier Le Pichon
1992 Martin Harold Phillips Bott
1993 Samuel Epstein
1994 William Jason Morgan
1995 George P. L. Walker
1996 Nicholas John Shackleton
1997 Douglas James Shearman
1998 Karl Karekin Turekian
1999 John Frederick Dewey
2000 William Sefton Fyfe

2001–
2001 Harry Blackmore Whittington
2002 Rudolf Trümpy
2003 Ikuo Kushiro
2004 Geoffrey Eglinton
2005 Ted Irving
2006 James Lovelock
2007 Andrew Knoll
2008 Norman Sleep
2009 Paul F. Hoffman
2010 Richard H. Sibson
2011 Robert Stephen John Sparks
2012 Christopher Hawkesworth
2013 Kurt Lambeck
2014 Maureen Raymo - first woman to receive the Wollaston Medal
2015 James A. Jackson
2016 Susan L. Brantley
2017 Richard Alley
2018 Terry Plank
2019 Edward Stolper
2020 Barbara Romanowicz
2021 David D. Pollard
2022 Tanya Atwater
2023 Kathryn Whaler

See also

 List of geology awards
 List of awards named after people
 Geology of Great Britain

References

External links
 List of Wollaston Medal Winners

Geology awards
Palladium
Awards established in 1831
Awards of the Geological Society of London
British science and technology awards